Robbyanto Budiman (born 1967) is an Indonesian businessman, the CEO of PT Wahanaartha Harsaka Tbk, the holding company of Wahana Artha Group. The group's core business is PT Wahana Makmur Sejati, the main dealer for Honda motorcycles in Jakarta and Tangerang since 1972. He is a director of its subsidiary companies.

Early life
Budiman has a bachelor's degree from the University of Southern California and an MBA from Northrop University.

Career
After his college graduation, from 1989 to 1992, Budiman worked for Citibank, rising to asset services unit head.

Budiman has been CEO of Wahanaartha Harsaka, Indonesia's leading integrated motorcycle services group, since 1997.

Personal life
Budiman is married, with three daughters.

In 2013, Budiman bought a house in Beverly Hills, California, US, for US$4.2 million, close to where his sister lives.

References

1960s births
Indonesian chief executives
Living people
People from Beverly Hills, California
University of Southern California alumni
Northrop University alumni
People named in the Panama Papers